Simon David Manton White (born 30 September 1951), FRS, is a British astrophysicist. He was one of directors at the Max Planck Institute for Astrophysics before his retirement in late 2019.

Life 
White studied Mathematics at Jesus College, Cambridge in the University of Cambridge (B.A. 1972) and Astronomy at the University of Toronto (MSc 1974). In 1977 he obtained a doctorate in Astronomy under Donald Lynden-Bell entitled "The Clustering of Galaxies" at the University of Cambridge. After a few years at the University of California, Berkeley, the Steward Observatory of the University of Arizona and
the University of Cambridge he was appointed in 1994 as a Scientific Member of the Max Planck Society and as Director of the Max Planck Institute for Astrophysics in Garching. White is also Research Professor at the University of Arizona (1992), Guest Professor at the University of Durham (1995) Honorary Professor at the Ludwig-Maximilians University in Munich (1994) and at the Astronomical Observatories of Shanghai (SHAO) (1999) and Beijing (BAO) (2001). White lives in
Munich with his wife, the astrophysicist Guinevere Kauffmann, and their son Jonathan.

Work 
White has worked primarily on the formation of structure in the Universe. He is known for his contributions
to our understanding of galaxy formation and for his role in helping to establish the viability of the
current standard model for the evolution of cosmic structure, the so-called ΛCDM model.

Already at the time of his doctoral work he studied the influence of Dark Matter on the growth of structure and in 1978 he and Martin Rees argued that the properties of galaxies can be understood if they
form by condensation of gas at the centres of extended and hierarchically clustering dark matter halos.

In later years White developed computer models which allowed the growth of galaxies and galaxy clustering to
be simulated directly in order to allow quantitative comparison of theoretical models with astronomical
observations. His work with Marc Davis, George Efstathiou and Carlos Frenk was particularly
influential in establishing that a universe dominated by Cold Dark Matter could produce large-scale structure
in the galaxy distribution which closely resembles that observed. A more recent large project was
the Millennium Simulation, carried out in Garching in 2005 as part of the work of a large international
collaboration, the Virgo Consortium. This simulation followed the formation of more than 2,000,000 
galaxies throughout a cubic region more than 2 billion light-years on a side.

Work by White has addressed issues of stellar dynamics, of the detailed structure
of galaxies and their dark halos, of the processes controlling galaxy formation, of the structure and evolution of galaxy clusters, and of the statistics of galaxy clustering. Papers include
those with Julio Navarro and Carlos Frenk on the "universal" structure of dark matter halos. The Navarro–Frenk–White profile is named after them.

White's more than 500 publications in the refereed professional literature have been cited more than 244,000 times by other scientists (status end-2022 according to Google Scholar).

Awards and honours 

 Helen B. Warner Prize of the American Astronomical Society, 1986
 Editor of Monthly Notices of the Royal Astronomical Society, 1992–present
 Fellow of the Royal Society, 1997
 Max-Planck Research Prize for International Cooperation, 2000
 Dannie Heineman Prize for Astrophysics of the AIP/AAS, 2005 (with George Efstathiou)
 Fellow of the Deutsche Akademie der Naturforscher Leopoldina, 2005
 Gold Medal of the Royal Astronomical Society, 2006
 Honorary Doctorate (D.Sc.) at the University of Durham, 2007
 Foreign Associate, US National Academy of Sciences, 2007
 Brouwer Award (Division on Dynamical Astronomy) of the American Astronomical Society, 2008
 European Latsis Prize 2008: Astrophysics
 Fellow of the Academia Europaea, 2009
 Max Born Prize of the German Physical Society and the Institute of Physics, 2010
 Honorary Citizen of the City of Padova, 2010
 Gruber Prize in Cosmology 2011 (with Marc Davis, George Efstathiou and Carlos Frenk)
 Foreign Member of the Chinese Academy of Sciences, 2015
 Shaw Prize 2017 in Astronomy
 Clarivate Citation Laureate in Physics 2020

References

External links 
Simon White site
Interview with Simon White from October 2011

20th-century British astronomers
1951 births
Living people
Recipients of the Gold Medal of the Royal Astronomical Society
People from Ashford, Kent
Fellows of the Royal Society
Foreign associates of the National Academy of Sciences
Foreign members of the Chinese Academy of Sciences
Winners of the Dannie Heineman Prize for Astrophysics
21st-century British astronomers
Alumni of Jesus College, Cambridge
Max Planck Institute directors